The Drutajan Express is an inter-city train of Bangladesh Railway service. It gives service between the capital Dhaka and the northern Panchagarh District. At first it was operated from Dinajpur to Dhaka Cantonment Station, then extended to Panchagarh and Kamalapur. It is one of the fastest and luxury trains in Bangladesh.

Schedule and Stations 
Drutajan express departs from Panchagarh railway station at 7:20 am and reaches Dhaka at 6:10 pm every day. It takes 10 hours 40 minutes for a trip. The departure from Dhaka is at 8 pm and reaches Panchagarh at 6:35 am every day. The number of coach in the train is 13. The train stops at the following stations:
 Kamalapur Railway Station, Dhaka
 Airport Station
 Joydevpur
 Tangail
 East of the Jamuna Bridge
 West of the Jamuna Bridge
 Ishwardi Bypass
 Natore
 Ahsanganj
 Santaher
 Akkelpur
 Joypurhat
 Panchbibi
 Birampur
 Phulbari
 Parbatipur Railway Station
 Dinajpur Railway Station
 Thakurgaon
 Panchagarh

See also
 Maitree Express
 Samjhauta Express
 Lalmoni Express

References 

Named passenger trains of Bangladesh
Transport in Dhaka